Pancar Merah is an Islamic talisman found among the Banjar people from South Borneo.
It is used to protect and defend the bearer when dealing with people of high status such are tribal leaders or kings.

Pancar Merah has a circular shape with a diameter of 50-70 mm, it is made from silver, copper, silver plated copper or brass and is richly engraved on both sides with Arabic scripts.
On the front side a Pancar Merah is usually engraved with the 99 Names of Allah (Al Asma Ul Husna) and the back side is engraved in accordance with the wishes of the talisman`s orderer (fortune, charisma, security, love or similar).

Pancar Merah is made by a skilled person with a high spiritual level, usually a kyai (ulama, sheikh), and it is crafted only in certain times or periods before or after praying or fasting.

The most notable pieces of Pancar Merah were made in desa (village) Dalam Pagar near Martapura, South Kalimantan, Indonesia before World War II.

References

External links 
 http://idr.iain-antasari.ac.id/48/1/JIMAT%20.pdf
 https://books.google.com/books?id=Yah5AAAAMAAJ

Banjar people
Indonesian art
Islamic art